The term Bulgarian Catholic Church can refer to:

 Catholic Church in Bulgaria, communities and institutions of the Catholic Church in Bulgaria (including the Latin Church)
 Bulgarian Byzantine Catholic Church, a "sui juris" Eastern Catholic Church of the Byzantine Rite in Bulgaria
 Bulgarian Catholic Apostolic Exarchate of Sofia, an Apostolic Exarchate for Eastern Catholics of the Byzantine Rite in Bulgaria

See also 
 Bulgarian Catholic Apostolic Vicariate of Constantinople
 Bulgarian Catholic Apostolic Vicariate of Thrace
 Bulgarian Catholic Apostolic Vicariate of Macedonia
 Albanian Catholic Church 
 Belarusian Catholic Church
 Croatian Catholic Church 
 Greek Catholic Church
 Hungarian Catholic Church
 Romanian Catholic Church
 Russian Catholic Church
 Serbian Catholic Church 
 Slovak Catholic Church
 Ukrainian Catholic Church